NASA's Exceptional Public Service Medal is a United States government awarded to any non-Government individual or to an individual who was not a Government employee during the period in which the service was performed for sustained performance that embodies multiple contributions on NASA projects, programs, or initiatives.

The criteria must include all of the following:
 Sustained performance has made a significant improvement to NASA deliverables, operations, or image;
 Employee's record of achievements sets a benchmark for other non-Government contributors to follow; substantial improvement to a NASA program that yielded high quality results or improvements;
 Impact and importance of the employee's services have made a lasting impact on the success of the Agency

See also 
 NASA Distinguished Public Service Medal
 NASA Public Service Group Award
 List of NASA awards

EPSM Awardees

2021

 Dr. Vinay Goyal, Adjunct Professor at University of California Los Angeles, Part-time Faculty at University of Southern California, and Technical Fellow at The Aerospace Corporation: For outstanding engineering support to safety of flight assessments, methodology development, and engineering analyses of critical interest to NASA and its missions.

2020

 Margarita Aponte
 Paul A. Catalano
 Gregory P. Frederick
 Richard J. Kearney
 Arnold Kuchenmeist

2019

 Carolus J. Schrijver, for demonstrating scientific excellence through outstanding leadership and dedication in support of NASA Heliophysics missions and the impact to the community.
 Richard W. Eastes, for successfully implementing NASA’s first hosted payload mission and for significant and lasting scientific contributions to atmospheric and space physics.
 Kamal Oudghiri.

2018

 Dean A. Szabo, for outstanding service to the air-breathing propulsion community and in mentoring the next generation of test and data engineers at Glenn Research Center (GRC).
 Benjamin P. Saldua, for exceptional service by improving structural design of the Deep Space Network antennas, enabling operation at higher frequencies and efficiencies and NASA mission success at Jet Propulsion Laboratory (JPL).

2016
 Victor A. Canacci, for exceptional management of repair, maintenance, and upgrade projects in the test facilities at the NASA Glenn Research Center.
 James J. Kubera, for exceptional service to the design and deployment of innovative financial management processes resulting in efficiencies on multiple NASA contracts.

2015
 Eric C. Clemons, an employee of Vantage Partner LLC, for exceptional public service in managing the Glenn Engineering and Scientific Support (GESS) contract, plus leading strategic business development and partnership for the benefit of NASA, the agency and Ohio.
 Martha L. Clough, an employee of Leidos, for demonstrating outstanding service as the Leidos Program Manager for Safety, Health, Environmental and Mission Assurance Contract at Glenn.
 Jeffrey C. Smith, an employee of HX5 Sierra, for exceptional management of technician resources, the apprenticeship program and lifting device program in the test facilities at the NASA Glenn Research Center.

2014
 Richard L. Gilmore, an employee of SGT, Inc., for exceptional leadership in transforming the agency's approach evaluating the impact of projects and tools focused on students that are underrepresented and underserved.
 Paul J. Lizanich, an employee of Sierra Lobo, Inc., for exceptional leadership in the safe electrical and electronic operation of the Propulsion Systems Laboratory and as the vice chair of the Testing Division's Electrical Engineering team.
 Ruth E. Scina, an employee of Summit Technologies Solutions, for outstanding service in support of the Space Communication and Navigation Program, including configuration management, outreach and integration.
 William V. Meyer, an employee of Universities Space Research Association, for exceptional technical leadership in the field of soft-condensed matter physics.

2013
 Robert S. Arrighi, an employee of Wyle Information Systems, LLC., for exceptional achievement in documenting, preserving and promoting the rich history of NASA, its mission and its valuable historical cultural resources.
 E. Allen Arrington, an employee of Sierra Lobo, Inc., for exceptional technical contributions to the nation's wind tunnel testing community.
 Peter W. Phillips, an employee of The Aerospace Corporation, for work he performed for NASA Goddard Space Flight Center on the Suomi National Polar Partnership mission.

2012
 Christopher J. Blake, an employee of Booz Allen & Hamilton Inc., for exceptional public service to NASA's cost estimating and analyses community on multiple projects and initiatives.
 Gayle T. DiBiasio, an employee of Wyle Information Systems LLC, for sustained exceptional leadership and success in educating the public of NASA's Mission and significantly improving NASA's image through the use of cutting-edge multimedia. 
 Christine R. Gorecki, an employee of National Center for Space Exploration Research, for truly outstanding organizational contributions to NASA Exploration Technology Development and International Space Station research at the NASA Glenn Research Center.
 Richard D. Rinehart, an employee of DB Consulting Group Inc., for outstanding efforts in advancing the center's high-end computing and visualization capabilities, fostering multicenter collaborations, and promoting the agency and center.
 Edward L. Winstead, an employee of Science Systems and Applications Inc., for exceptional service in support of Langley's airborne atmospheric research field missions.

2011
 Kevin M. Lambert, an employee of QinetiQ North America, Inc., for outstanding contributions to radio frequency antenna metrology and electromagnetic characterization of materials in support of NASA's aerospace communications needs.
 Patricia E. Oleksiak, an employee of Singleton Health Services, LLC, for demonstrating exceptional dedication, commitment and professionalism in providing occupational health services resulting in improved worker safety and health.
 Euy-Sik (Eugene) E. Shin, an employee of Ohio Aerospace Institute, for significant contributions and dedication to the development and application of polymeric materials in aeronautics, science and exploration applications.

 Eileen M. Collins

2010
 William V. Boynton, an employee of the University of Arizona Planetary Science Department, for extraordinary performance leading the Phoenix Thermal and Evolved - Gas Analyzer (TEGA) science investigation of volatile materials on Mars.
 William A. Maul III, an employee of QinetiQ North America, Inc., for sustained superior contributions leading to the development of advanced space launch vehicle and propulsion systems health management technologies for NASA programs.
 Sandra H. Valenti, an employee of SAIC, for exceptional public service in improving the safety, health and environmental processes in LTID and Glenn Research Center.

2009
 Carol A. Galica, an employee of SGT Inc., for educating and inspiring students, teachers and the public about STEM and communicating the overall importance of the impacts of STEM on the nation's future workforce.
 Ann O. Heyward, an employee of Ohio Aerospace Institute, for exceptional community leadership that has resulted in greater awareness of NASA's contributions and has inspired the next generation of explorers.
 Michael Okuda, a graphic designer known for his work on Star Trek, for design work including projects like STS-125, Constellation program and Ares I-X.
 Byron D Tapley, a Professor at the University of Texas at Austin, for exemplary leadership, dedication and commitment to NASA as a member of the NASA Advisory Council

2008
 Iwan D. Alexander, for exceptional contributions to microgravity research and space exploration in multiple roles.
 Matt A. Murray, for exemplary contributions in support of communicating NASA's mission and goals.

2006
 Mark E. Ogles, President of Freedom Information Systems, Inc., for extraordinary efforts as a member of the Exploration Systems Architecture Study.

1988 
Carver G. Kennedy, an employee of Morton Thiokol Corporation, Vice President of Space Services.

1986 
James R. Brandenburg, an employee of NASA, for the integration and management of the MCC operations team.

1981 
Alfred M. Carey, an employee Rockwell International, Director of Configuration Management Space Transportation Division.

1985
The singer John Denver

1983
• Robert F. Hieter, Vice President of Production Operations at Martin Marietta Manned Space Systems, overseeing the assembly of the Space Shuttle external fuel tanks. 

1982
 
•Karl Kachigan, Director of SLV-3D ATlas, Atlas/Centaur and Titan/Centaur Launch Vehicle Systems General Dynamics, For Exceptional Contributions to the NASA expendable launch vehicle programs through planning , Management , design , mission adaption and development

References

External links
 NASA awards
 National Aeronautics and Space Administration Honor Awards (1969-1978)

Public Service Medal